Riverview is an unincorporated locale in Lane County, Oregon, United States. Riverview lies at the intersection of River Road and Riverview Drive, southeast of Junction City, near the Willamette River.

References

Unincorporated communities in Lane County, Oregon
Unincorporated communities in Oregon